Mulgimaa is a cultural-historical region in South Estonia. The region encompasses nowadays Viljandi County and northwestern Valga County. Historically, Mulgimaa was divided into five parishes: Halliste, Helme, Karksi, Paistu and Tarvastu.

Traditionally, Mulgi dialect has been spoken in Mulgimaa.

References

External links
 http://www.mulgikultuur.ee/
 https://mulgimaa.ee/

Subdivisions of Estonia